Coma Rage is the fourth album by Brazilian heavy metal band Viper, released in 1995.

Track listing

Personnel
Pit Passarell - vocal, bass, backing vocals
Yves Passarell - guitar, backing vocals
Felipe Machado - guitar, backing vocals
Renato Graccia - drums, backing vocals

Additional Info
Engineered and Mixed by Bill Metoyer
Mastered at Future Disc
Executive Producer: Jeroen Vonk
Cover artwork by Antonio Marcelino (Studio N)
Cover concept/layout by Felipe Machado and Rodrigo Cerveira
Photos by Marcelo Rossi
Guitar Solo on "Somebody Told Me You're Dead" by Ernie-C from Body Count (appears courtesy of Virgin Records America, Inc.)

External links
 Viper official site

References

1995 albums
Viper (band) albums
Roadrunner Records albums